Olivia is a children's computer-animated comedy television series produced by media company Chorion and based on Ian Falconer's books, after its first live-action TV series, The Olivia Squared TV Show. The series won a silver Parents' Choice Award for its positive storylines and characters. The series premiered on January 26, 2009 on Nick Jr. and aired episodes through October 29, 2015. 40 episodes were produced.

In 2012, Classic Media would acquire the rights to the show from Chorion. Since then, Classic Media was sold to DreamWorks Animation and became DreamWorks Classics. In 2016, DreamWorks Animation became a subsidiary of NBCUniversal.

Plot
Taking place in a world where all characters are pigs, Olivia revolves around the title character and her family. The plots are mostly everyday situations in which Olivia finds herself and her unique way of dealing with them. In almost every episode from season 1, Olivia also dispenses her "Rules of Life". In each episode, Olivia dreams of having a job from the episode's experiences, such as being an artist after visiting the art gallery or being her mum's assistant after helping plan her friend's birthday party. Olivia sings the goodnight song at the end of each episode in Season 2 of Olivia.

Episodes

Characters
 Olivia (voiced by Emily Gray) is a young pig and the main character of the show. She is imaginative and fantasizes about different roles, such as a pop star or superhero. She displays good behavior and shows kids how to share, use their imaginations, be physically active, and be self-confident. She is in 1st grade.

Olivia's family
 Ian (voiced by Michael Van Citters) is Olivia's younger brother. He looks up to Olivia and enjoys being included in her activities, but often becomes the typical annoying "little bother". He likes, among other things, dinosaurs, robots and baseball. In Season 2, he becomes less annoying, is more intelligent, on better terms with his sister, has a small planet on his T-shirt and a deeper voice.
 William (voiced by Robert Toonitititusa) is Olivia and Ian's baby brother and typically sleeps, eats, and cries.
 Mum, Olivia's mother (voiced by Joyce Beverley (Season 1) Jennifer Reiter (Season 2)), who runs her own party-planning business from home.
 Dad, Olivia's father (voiced by Danny Katiana) is an architect and occasionally absent-minded. He often provides his paternal wisdom to Olivia and her brothers in "little talks".
 Grandma, Olivia's grandmother (voiced by Yvonne Craig). In her late-fifties, but still fun and adventurous.
 Uncle Garrett (voiced by Connor Hall), Olivia's maternal uncle, is a professional football player and is a bit of a comedian. He performs ballet with Olivia and only appears in "Olivia Takes Ballet".
 Grandpa Cedric, Olivia's unseen grandfather that Olivia mentions in "Olivia's Day at the Office".
 Perry and Edwin, Olivia's dog and cat. Perry is energetic and loves to play with the children, while Edwin is generally lethargic and prefers to sleep.
 Goldfish, a goldfish whose owner is Ian. It is rarely seen.
 Cedric, a one-time frog that Ian found and named after his Grandpa.

Friends
 Julian (voiced by Jeremy Herzig) is Olivia's male best friend. He's smart with a self-deprecating sense of humor, but shy and lets Olivia take the lead. While often reluctant to go along with Olivia's ideas, he finally always does.
 Francine (voiced by Brianna McCracken (Season 1) and Josie Baker (Season 2)) is Olivia's female best friend. In the first season, she can be snobby, villainous, tries to make Olivia feel jealous at times, and often serves as the antagonist. She acts more "girly" than Olivia and will not touch anything gross. Her birthday is eight months after Olivia's. In Season 2, Francine gets better and friendly to Olivia and her classmates.
 Gwendolyn is Francine's yellowish orange tabby. She is very talented and likes Edwin. In one episode, Francine reveals that she sometimes dresses her in Barbie Fashions to have a tea party and makes Gwendolyn fish sticks.
 Herman is Francine's dog. He makes his only appearance in "Olivia Trains Her Cat". He can ride a skateboard and also knows tricks like Gwendolyn.

School
 Mrs. Hogenmuller (voiced by Susan Balboni), Olivia's teacher, is a dedicated educator, if a bit eccentric. She is an avid cat fancier and cowbell-playing virtuoso, with a penchant for the outdoors and a great enthusiasm for learning and life. She has 3 pets: two cats and a turkey.
 Alexandra (voiced by Zarii Arri) is Olivia's classmate and a girl. She often agrees only along with Francine.
 Sam (voiced by John Mumelo), a classmate. He rarely talks. He has a pet opossum named Sally.
 Harold Hockenberri (voiced by Dayton Malone), a classmate. Harold is allergic to parsley, wears glasses, and his mum hates frogs. He can juggle but hiccups when nervous. He has a parrot that says things such as "Hi there," three times.
 Oscar and Otto, identical twin classmates whose recurring catchphrase is, "It's cool."
 Daisy (voiced by Katie Leigh), a small classmate who wears an all-purple-attire. In Season 1, she is a nice girl. In Season 2, she replaces Francine as a troublemaker.
 Connor (voiced by Alicyn Packard), a classmate who looks like Sam but talks more.
 Olivia 2 (voiced by Mary Smith), a character that made her only appearance in the episode "The Two Olivias". Olivia was a new student in Olivia's class, much to the original Olivia's annoyance. They reconcile having the same name at the end of the episode. Olivia 2 was never seen in the episodes after it, presuming that her family moved out after a short time.
 Sophie, a girl who wears a yellow T-shirt and thin light purple jumper. In Season 1, she had no name, but in "Olivia's Tip-Top Tapper", the girl's name was revealed as Sophie.  She and Sam rarely speak.
 Caitlin, who wears a blue shirt with white polka-dots. She is rarely spoken like Sam and Sophie.

Shorts
The shorts are small, generally wordless segments in each episode (two per). They include the following:

William Eats (And Burps)
 William is hungry so Mum puts him in his highchair and goes to get him some applesauce. While she is gone, everyone else gives him tidbits of food. At the end, Mum says she thought he was hungry, but it appears William does not want his applesauce. She is surprised when he burps.

Olivia in the Bathroom
 While Dad is shaving, Olivia keeps taking her stool, getting up on it and doing something in front of the sink and mirror such as brushing her ears. At the end of the short she gets on her stool and kisses Dad.

Olivia and Her Toy
 Olivia tries to get her favourite doll to stand up straight, but it won't so she tapes it to the wall and the two have a tea party.

Olivia Scares Ian
 Olivia tries to scare her little 'bother' but she can't time it right. Later Ian scares her.

Olivia Builds a Tower
 Olivia is building a tower of random items. Ian, Perry, and William try to knock it down, but Mum and Dad forbid it. At the end Olivia purposely knocks it down.

Olivia Cheers Up William
 There are two versions of this short. In one (used during the first season), William is upset and Olivia tries to cheer him up. At the end (when Olivia is in her cow costume), she hurts her leg by stepping on a block and cheers him up. The other (used during the second) is similar, except with Olivia laying Edwin beside William instead of hurting her foot.

Olivia's Bookbag
 Olivia is stuffing her bookbag for school with Perry and Ian taking her things then returning them each time she leaves the room. In the end, her bookbag becomes too heavy for her to carry and when she puts it on she falls over backwards.

William Goes for a Ride
 Olivia puts on her train hat takes her family on a ride in her wagon. First it's just William, who is then joined by Perry, then Edwin, and finally Ian. The wagon gets heavier as each kid and pet climbs on board. At the end all the kids and pets are pulled in the wagon by Dad.

Ian Wants to Play
 Olivia and Julian are jumping rope and Ian wants to play, also. Throughout the entire short Ian is trying to get their attention but he is unsuccessful. Finally at the end he gets their attention and Olivia and Ian jump rope.

Olivia's Hidden Talent
 When Olivia sees a bowl of oranges she discovers she has a hidden talent for juggling. When she throws four oranges in the air they disappear. When she looks up, she realizes Ian who is standing on the stairs above her has caught them.

Olivia Slides
 Olivia and her toys slide many different ways in the park.

Perry Plays Fetch
 Olivia throws three different balls to Perry. The first two, a baseball and a soccer ball, he retrieves. The last, a beachball, he returns walking on. Olivia then throws a smaller baseball and he walks on the beachball to fetch the baseball.

Olivia's Trivia
 Olivia gets three pails and a ball which she puts under the red pail. She mixes them up and finally Perry guesses which pail the ball is under and gets the ball and Olivia chases Perry for the ball.

Olivia's Many Sandwiches
 Olivia makes herself a sandwich and walks away. When she returns it is gone, and she blames it on Perry. After a couple of sandwiches Ian covers Olivia's favourite toy in peanut butter and at the end the toy falls to the floor and Perry licks it as Olivia chases Ian.

Olivia's Picture
 Olivia paints a picture of a pig with a blue background. The short ends showing the fridge filled with many copies of the same picture and Olivia replies "I think I'm done with my blue period," a reference to Pablo Picasso's blue period.

Edwin's Surprise
 Olivia is trying to draw a picture, but Edwin keeps laying on top of the picture resulting in Olivia moving him again and again. At the end the viewers see that the picture is of Edwin.

Olivia's Metamorphosis
 Olivia is about to go outside but Mum warns her it is about to get very cold.  When Olivia opens the front door she imagines emperor penguins and snow. William flies away but Dad catches him. Olivia goes to her room and dresses for winter, but when she goes to the door again, it is hot outside. Olivia dresses like it is summer and Mum asks her why she keeps changing clothes. Olivia says it is the weather that's changing.

Olivia's Sculpture
 At the beach, Olivia finds a pile of sand and decides to make a sand sculpture of herself by shaping it and adding shells.

The Chase
 Olivia chases around Perry and Ian after they cause mischief for her. At the end Ian chases Perry.

Olivia's Magic Trick
 Olivia tries to make her cookie disappear but is unsuccessful. Later Perry eats it.

Olivia's Inflated Pirate Ship
 The mailman brings a package for Olivia. He knocks on the door and walks away. Olivia opens the door and sees the package and opens it. When Olivia sees another box. She opens it and so on. 5 boxes are there and Olivia sees a purple flat cube. She pulls the string and it inflates into an inflated pirate ship. At the end, Olivia plays in the inflated pirate ship.

Olivia VS Ian
On a stage, Olivia pulls out a trunk full of musical instruments. However, before she can even start playing music, Ian, who's been hiding behind the box suddenly swipes the instruments right out of her hands. First a violin, then a trumpet, and a guitar. Growing frustrated, Olivia has an idea and pulls out a pair of cymbals. When Ian tries his swiping technique again, Olivia crashes the cymbals together, scaring Ian. After laughing it off, both start playing music together.

Broadcast
In addition to airing on Milkshake! and Nick Jr. in the UK and TG4 In Ireland, the series was aired on Nick Jr. from 1 February 2009 until 30 October 2015 when Nickelodeon and Paramount Global lost the rights to air the series. The show came back on air and was broadcast on Universal Kids in the United States, Disney Junior in Latin America and Brazil, and Treehouse TV in Canada.

See also
 Olivia (fictional pig)

References

External links
 
 

Olivia (TV series)
2000s American animated television series
2000s British animated television series
2000s preschool education television series
2009 American television series debuts
2009 British television series debuts
2010s American animated television series
2010s British animated television series
2010s preschool education television series
2015 American television series endings
2015 British television series endings
American children's animated comedy television series
American computer-animated television series
American preschool education television series
American television shows based on children's books
Animated preschool education television series
Animated television series about children
Animated television series about pigs
British children's animated comedy television series
British computer-animated television series
British preschool education television series
British television shows based on children's books
English-language television shows
Irish children's animated comedy television series
Irish preschool education television series
Nick Jr. original programming
Nickelodeon original programming
Television series by Brown Bag Films
Television series by Universal Television
Treehouse TV original programming